Anna Lucina Hemmings  (born 19 December 1976) is a British marathon kayakist who competed in the 1990s and 2000s (decade), winning six world championship gold medals.

Hemmings, who was born in Hammersmith, also competed in sprint kayaking. She was eliminated in the semifinals of the K-1 500 m event at the 2000 Summer Olympics in Sydney. Eight years later in Beijing, Hemmings was eliminated in the heats of the K-2 500 m event.

Hemmings was appointed Member of the Order of the British Empire (MBE) in the 2010 New Year Honours.

Hemmings has visited a number of schools, including St Ursula's in Greenwich, where she presented the children with their end-of-year awards, including the students of the year for year 7 and 8 and the prefects of the year for year 7 and 8. On 14 December 2012, Hemmings visited The Langley Academy which is a secondary school in Slough which is a town located on the outskirts/next to west London and gave a motivational speech about how she gained success from a world champion to an Olympian and also her obstacles.

References

 Sports-Reference.com profile
 Hickok Sports History

External links
 
 
 

1976 births
English female canoeists
Canoeists at the 2000 Summer Olympics
Canoeists at the 2008 Summer Olympics
Living people
Olympic canoeists of Great Britain
Members of the Order of the British Empire
British female canoeists
People from Hammersmith